Khokababu  is an Indian Bengali action comedy film directed by Shankar Aiyya. The film stars Dev, Subhashree Ganguly, Ferdous, and Laboni Sarkar in the lead roles. This film is an unofficial remake of a Telugu film, Dhee.

Synopsis
The film is about Abir Roy a.k.a. Khoka/Khokababu (Dev) who is a cool and a clever guy. Shankar Das a.k.a. Bhaiji (Ferdous) is a well-known don in his territory whom everybody fears and obeys. Khoka joins Bhaiji's circle as an accountant where he has a wacky senior Khanra Babu (Subhashish Mukherjee). Khoka with his super wit starts to obtain every luxury that a perfect office should have and starts to hoax Bhaiji. Problems occur when Khoka falls in love with Bhaiji's sister Pooja (Subhashree Ganguly). Anyone who even looks in her direction is simply dealt with in the cruellest possible way. Khoka somehow manages to win over Pooja and also gains the complete trust of Bhaiji by changing the system in which his business operates. Bhaiji asks him to look after Pooja as he considers his other employees to be incapable. Khoka and Pooja fall in love with each other and even get secretly married. She even goes to his house to stay for 3 days as Bhaiji's rival Ballu (Ashish Vidyarthi) is after her life. Bhaiji is completely unaware of Khoka and Pooja's relation, however he does come to know about it later. Can their love survive when Bhaiji is over-possessive about his sister and goons like Ballu are on the loose to take revenge from Bhaiji by killing his sister Pooja? That's how our super-clever Chalu Cheez Khokababu takes the story ahead.

Cast
 Dev as Abir a.k.a. Khoka/ Khokababu
 Subhashree Ganguly as Pooja
 Ferdous as Shankar Das a.k.a. Bhaiji
 Laboni Sarkar as Khoka's mother
 Tathoi Deb as Khoka's sister
 Biswajit Chakraborty as Khoka's father
 Locket Chatterjee as Bhaiji's wife
 Ashish Vidyarthi as Ballu
 Biplab Chattopadhyay as Jatin Prasad
 Subhasish Mukherjee as Khanra Babu
 Partha Sarathi Chakraborty as Peto
 Aritra Dutta Banik as Circuit
 Arindam Dutta as Raja
 Raju Majumdar as Khoka's friend

Box office
Khokababu collected Rs 15 million from its music release and 20 million from the satellite rights before its release. After that it opened as a thunderous hit in the Bengal theatres and in the first day it collected 3 million. It collected approx 40 million in 100 days.

Reviews
Khokababu opened with positive reviews from the critics. Gomolo.com gave it 3/5 saying "Viewers will not be disappointed at all with Khokababu which is a complete masala film with all the necessary ingredients in it." Subham Bhattacharyya, the Tollywood movies information, collection and ratings giver gave it 7/10 saying "It's a pure entertainment. We all can enjoy the film as per sure no time to bore". Burrp gave it 4/5 stars saying "It is a very good movie to watch, it is complete paisa wasool, with solid comedy, stylish action sequences, good music, and great location. Roshini Mukherjee of The Times Of India gave the film 3.5 stars out of 5 saying "Our advise, keep that logic behind, dig into a tub of corn and let Khokababu do the rest".

Soundtrack

References

Films scored by Savvy Gupta
Indian romantic comedy films
Bengali remakes of Telugu films
Bengali-language Indian films
2010s Bengali-language films
2012 romantic comedy films
2012 films
Films scored by Rishi Chanda